Mirny is a rural locality (a settlement) in Dinamovskoye Rural Settlement, Nekhayevsky District, Volgograd Oblast, Russia. The population was 34 as of 2010. There are 2 streets.

Geography 
Mirny is located 29 km southwest of Nekhayevskaya (the district's administrative centre) by road. Dinamo is the nearest rural locality.

References 

Rural localities in Nekhayevsky District